The Sitompok Bridge is a landmark bridge across Sitompok River in Kuala Penyu town in Interior Division, Sabah, Malaysia.

Bridges in Sabah
Kuala Penyu District